Lake Aheru is a lake of Estonia.

See also
List of lakes of Estonia

Aheru
Valga Parish
Aheru